Eric C. Lindholm is an American music conductor. He is the Harry S. and Madge Rice Thatcher Professor of Music at Pomona College in Claremont, California, and conducts the Pomona College Orchestra.

References

External links
Faculty page at Pomona College

Year of birth missing (living people)
Living people
Pomona College faculty
American conductors (music)